Gunnar Jacobson (born 5 April 1948) is a Swedish modern pentathlete. He competed at the 1976 Summer Olympics.

References

External links
 

1948 births
Living people
Swedish male modern pentathletes
Olympic modern pentathletes of Sweden
Modern pentathletes at the 1976 Summer Olympics
Sportspeople from Uppsala
20th-century Swedish people
21st-century Swedish people